was an amusement park in Osaka, Japan, just beside the Shin-Imamiya Station of the Osaka Loop Line of Nishinihon Japan Railway and Nankai Railway.

The park opened in July 1997. The city of Osaka invested in the park, but the theme park was originally managed by a private company which went bankrupt in 2004, and has since been managed by the municipal government of Osaka. In 2007, the local authorities decided to put the property up for sale.

The park was demolished on 19 March 2012. In late 2014, a new building on the site opened containing a Maruhan entertainment center and a Mega Donki outlet.

References

Defunct amusement parks in Japan
Buildings and structures in Osaka
1997 establishments in Japan
Amusement parks opened in 1997
Amusement parks closed in 2007
2007 disestablishments in Japan